The 2020 Magnus Carlsen Chess Tour was a series of online chess tournaments featuring most of the world’s best players, playing for a prize money pool of US$ 1 million. The tour consisted of 4 super-tournaments, with the winners then playing in a Grand Final in August 2020.

Format 
There were 5 total tournaments in the tour: 

 Magnus Carlsen Invitational, 18 April – 3 May 2020.
 Lindores Abbey Rapid Challenge (2020), 19 May – 3 June 2020.
 Chessable Masters (2020), 20 June – 5 July 2020.
 Legends of Chess (2020) 21 July – 5 August 2020. 
 Magnus Carlsen Chess Tour Finals benefiting Kiva (2020), 9 August – 20 August 2020.

Schedule

Results

Tournaments

Magnus Carlsen Invitational 

The results of the preliminary round were as follows.

Lindores Abbey Rapid Challenge 

The results of the preliminary round were as follows.

Chessable Masters 

The results of the preliminary round were as follows.

Group A

Group B

Legends of Chess 

The results of the preliminary round were as follows.

Magnus Carlsen Chess Tour Finals benefiting Kiva 

The results of the preliminary round were as follows.

Notes

References 

Chess competitions
Virtual events
2020 in chess
Magnus Carlsen